The Fort William Canadians were a junior ice hockey team based in Fort William, Ontario, Canada. The Canadians were members of the Thunder Bay Junior A Hockey League and were Abbott Cup finalists three times.  For a while, the Fort William Canadiens were a development club for the National Hockey League's Montreal Canadiens.

Season-by-season standings

Playoffs
1971 Lost Semi-final
Westfort Hurricanes defeated Fort William Canadians 3-games-to-2
1972 DNQ
1973 Won League Jr. A Crown, Lost TBAHA Canadian Final
Fort William Canadians defeated Thunder Bay Eagles 3-games-to-none TBJHL JR. A CHAMPIONS
Thunder Bay Centennials (CAJHL) defeated Fort William Canadians 2-games-to-none
1974 Won League, Lost TBAHA Jack Adams Trophy final
Fort William Canadians defeated Thunder Bay Beavers 3-games-to-2 TBJHL CHAMPIONS
Thunder Bay Hurricanes (MWJHL) defeated Fort William Canadians 4-games-to-none
1975 Lost Semi-final
Thunder Bay Eagles defeated Fort William Canadians 4-games-to-2
1976 Lost Semi-final
Thunder Bay Eagles defeated Fort William Canadians 4-games-to-none
1977 Lost Semi-final
Thunder Bay Eagles defeated Fort William Canadians 3-games-to-none
1978 DNQ

Championships
TBJHL Champions:
1939, 1947, 1953, 1954, 1955, 1957, 1958, 1959, 1961, 1963, 1964, 1966
Abbott Cup Finalists:
1952, 1954, 1957

Notable players
Columbus Club Canadians

Dave Creighton
Danny Lewicki

Canadiens 

John Adams
Stan Baluik
Rick Bragnalo
Mike Busniuk
Ron Busniuk
Jean Gauthier
Pete Goegan
Danny Gruen
Don Johns
Eddie Kachur
Lou Marcon
Stu McNeill
Dennis Olson
Mel Pearson
John Schella
Dave Siciliano
Ralph Stewart
Joe Szura
Ted Tucker
Gary Veneruzzo
Murray Wing

References

Hockey Northwestern Ontario
1935 establishments in Ontario
1978 disestablishments in Ontario